Margaret C. Wu is a Chinese-American biostatistician who worked at the National Heart, Lung, and Blood Institute on topics including the analysis of clinical trials, longitudinal studies, and censored data.

Education and career
Wu earned a Ph.D. in 1973 from Johns Hopkins University, with the dissertation Asymptotic Behavior of Posterior Distributions and Bayes's Estimators for the Independent Not Identically Distributed Case, supervised by 
Charles A. Rohde.

She worked in the Office of Biostatistics Research at the National Heart, Lung, and Blood Institute, part of the National Institutes of Health (NIH), from 1973 until her retirement in 2001.

Recognition
Wu won the National Institutes of Health MERIT Award in 1989. She was elected as a Fellow of the American Statistical Association in 1994.

References

Year of birth missing (living people)
Living people
American statisticians
American women statisticians
Johns Hopkins University alumni
National Institutes of Health people
Fellows of the American Statistical Association
21st-century American women